Schistura cryptofasciata is a species of ray-finned fish in the stone loach genus Schistura from the Nanting River in Yunnan.

References 

C
Fish described in 2005